Joseph R. Corso (September 11, 1908 – July 16, 1990) was an American politician who served in the New York State Assembly from 1949 to 1966.

He died of heart disease on July 16, 1990, in Manhattan, New York City, New York at age 81.

References

1908 births
1990 deaths
Democratic Party members of the New York State Assembly
20th-century American politicians